Emmanuel Letouzé (born 1975) is a French development economist, economic demographer and political cartoonist who focuses on data and development and the author of the United Nations Global Pulse White Paper "Big Data for Development" in 2012.

Letouzé is a Marie Curie Fellow at the Universitat Pompeu Fabra in Barcelona and the Director and co-Founder of Data-Pop Alliance, a not-for-profit organization focusing on Big Data, Artificial Intelligence and human development created in 2013 with the Harvard Humanitarian Initiative (HHI), MIT Media Lab and Overseas Development Institute (ODI), where he holds research affiliations as a visiting scientist at HHI, MIT Connection Science Founding Fellow, and research associate at ODI.

His work lies at the intersection of human development and data science, especially the applications and implications of digital data and technologies for sustainable development, official statistics, poverty and inequality, criminality, migration, gender equality, conflict and fragility, press freedom, privacy, data and algorithmic governance, public health, and "Human Artificial Intelligence".

Early life and career

Letouzé was born in Brittany, France and grew up in the banlieue of Paris, Sweden and Kuwait. After studying at Lycée Henri IV, he received a BA in Political Science and Economics and an MA in Applied Economics specialized in Economic Demography from Sciences Po Paris, the latter with field work at the Institut de Recherche pour le Développement in Dakar, Senegal, an MA in International Affairs from Columbia University School of International and Public Affairs on a Fulbright fellowship, and a PhD from the University of California, Berkeley with a dissertation on "Applications and Implications of Call-Detail Records for Demo-Economic Analysis" under the supervision of Ronald Lee, Edward Miguel and Jennifer Johnson-Hanks. He completed his post-doctoral research in 2016-17 at the MIT Media Lab in Alex 'Sandy' Pentland's Human Dynamics Group.

Between 2000 and 2004, Letouzé worked in Hanoi, Vietnam for the French Ministry of Finance and French Ministry of Foreign Affairs, leading a technical assistance project on Economic Governance with the Vietnamese General Statistics Office, Ministry of Finance, and National Assembly. He then worked as an Economist for the United Nations Development Programme in New York between 2005 and 2009, on fiscal policy and fiscal space for poverty reduction, post-conflict economic recovery, and migration as part of the 2009 Human Development Report research team. In 2011, he joined UN Global Pulse in the Executive Office of the UN Secretary General where he wrote the White Paper "Big Data for Development: Challenges and Opportunities". He was then the lead author of the 2013 OECD Fragile States report, which proposed to "move away from a “thin”, formal conceptualisation of fragility centred on the state, towards a “thick”, substantive understanding centred on the quality of state-society relations and with greater attention to potential stress factors, including economic vulnerability, demographic dynamics, climate change and technological innovation."

In late 2013, he co-founded Data-Pop Alliance and in 2016 he co-founded the Open Algorithms project (OPAL), which he directed from 2017 to 2020.  In 2021, Letouzé joined the Universitat Pompeu Fabra as a Marie Curie Fellow.

Letouzé focuses on developing countries and has conducted field work in Benin, Brazil, Chile, Côte d'Ivoire, Colombia, Dominican Republic, Ecuador, Egypt, Ghana, Haiti, Kenya, Jordan, Liberia, Lebanon, Mexico, Maldives, Mauritania, Moldova, Peru, Rwanda, Senegal, Sierra Leone, Togo, Tunisia, Thailand, and Vietnam.

As a cartoonist, under the alias "Manu", he has published political and editorial cartoons and illustrations in France and the US.

Data-Pop Alliance

Letouzé co-founded Data-Pop Alliance in 2013 with Alex 'Sandy' Pentland, Patrick Vinck and Claire Melamed, with initial seed funding from the Rockefeller Foundation. Data-Pop Alliance is a non-governmental organization with a global team and scope of work. Its aim is to "change the world with data" through three pillars of work: diagnosing local realities and human problems with data and AI; mobilizing capacities, communities, and ideas towards more data literate societies; and transforming systems and processes that underpin societies and countries.

From 2014 to 2020, Data-Pop Alliance was hosted by ThoughtWorks in New York City. In 2018, it opened a regional office in Mexico City and in 2021, a regional office in Dakar, Senegal. Nuria Oliver serves as Data-Pop Alliance's Chief Data Scientist.

In a 2015 interview with KD Nuggets about the creation of Data-Pop Alliance, Letouzé said:

I had the idea of creating 'something' like Data-Pop Alliance since about late 2012, after I left Global Pulse where I worked and wrote the White Paper "Big Data and Development" in 2010–11. That paper was my 1st foray into what was then a tiny field, and it opened doors. I was back in UC Berkeley working on my PhD in 2012–13, and was increasingly involved in the field as it started growing, talking at a few conferences, writing a few articles—and I wanted to build something lasting with a bit of a different feel and focus compared to what existed (Global Pulse, DataKind, for instance). I wanted to create something more academic with a greater emphasis on capacity building, on politics, and work with partners in developing countries

Data-Pop Alliance currently operates projects in over 20 countries, with staff located in Latin America, the MENA region and Europe. Some of its key partners are UNDP, the Deutsche Gesellschaft für Internationale Zusammenarbeit (GIZ), UNESCO, WFP, DIAL, UN-ESCWA, the Inter-American Development Bank, and the Vodafone Institute for Society and Communications.

Just changed to "According to the 2021-2023 Annual Report  its thematic programs are:

 1. Just Digital Transformations
 2. AI and Statistics for the SDGs
 3. Resilient Livelihoods and Ecosystems
 4. Data Feminism
 5. Geographies of Inequalities
 6. Technology and Democracy

Affiliations and awards

 Appointed Member of the European Commission's Expert Group on Facilitating the use of new data sources for official statistics (March 2021 – March 2022)
 Marie Curie Fellow, Socio-Demography Group, Department of Political Science, Universitat Pompeu Fabra (February 2021 – February 2023)
 Visiting Scientist, Harvard Humanitarian Initiative (May 2020 – present)
 Founding Fellow, MIT Connection Science (2015–present)
 Research Associate, Overseas Development Institute (2014–present)
 Member of the Technical Advisory Group, Global Partnership for Sustainable Development Data (2017–present) 
 Member of 2015–18 Panel Big Data and Population Processes of the International Union for the Scientific Study of Population
 Member of the Program Committee of the 1st and 2nd editions of the UN World Data Forum (2017 and 2018)
 University of California Regent's Scholarship, UC Berkeley (2009–2011)
 University of California Dean's Normative Time Fellowship, UC Berkeley (2013–2014)
 J. William Fulbright Fellowship (Columbia University, 2004–2005)
 Sasakawa Foundation Young Leader Fellowship Grant for research in Hanoi, Vietnam (2005)
 Invited Member of the Cartoon Movement (2014–present)

Political cartooning 

Letouzé is a political cartoonist under the pen name "Manu". He was the editorial cartoonist of French regional daily newspaper L'Union de Reims from 1997 to 2004, where he published over 350 cartoons. He has also contributed political cartoons to the weekly magazine Politis, news website Rue89, and to the satirical website Stuff Expat Aid Workers Like. He held a solo exhibition at The Invisible Dog Art Center in New York in 2011, and became an appointed member of the Cartoon Movement in 2012.

In 2011, with other French cartoonists he took part in the response to the first attack against Charlie Hebdo's offices, and contributed cartoons to the campaign for marriage equality in France. In January 2015, he published a tribute to Charlie Hebdo cartoonists titled "They Killed My Idols" in the Nib, and in February 2015, he participated in a debate organized by PEN America, the French Institute Alliance Française (FIAF), and the National Coalition Against Censorship (NCAC) on "After Charlie: What's next for art, satire, and censorship?" at FIAF with Art Spiegleman, Molly Crabapple and Francoise Mouly.

He has contributed cartoons and illustrations to several humanitarian publications and campaigns, including for the Sphere Standards, which sets international humanitarian assistance standards, and the International Peace Institute's Management Handbook for UN Peacekeeping missions.

He regularly uses cartoons in his academic publications and presentations on data and development and in 2020 he spoke at the UN World Data Forum about the influence of his work as a cartoonist on his work as an economist.

Selected publications 

On Big data and development:

Letouzé, E. (2012) "Big Data for Development: Challenges and Opportunities". UN Global Pulse
Bravo, M. A., Letouzé, E., Oliver, N., and Shoup, N. (2021). "Policy Paper: Using Data to Fight COVID-19 – And Build Back Better". Vodafone Institute.
Bravo, M. A., Casasbuenas, V., Letouzé., E. and Lozano, A. (2020). "Definición de la estrategia de Big Data para el estado colombiano y para el desarrollo de la industria de Big Data en Colombia". Data-Pop Alliance. 
 Oliver, N., Letouzé, E. et al. (2020)."Mobile phone data for informing public health actions across the COVID-19 pandemic life cycle". Science Advances
 Oliver,N., Letouzé, E. et al. (2020) "Mobile phone data and COVID-19: Missing an opportunity?".Arvix preprint.
Clavijo, A., Letouzé, E., Loaiza, I., Pentland, A., Ricard, J., and Silva, D., (2019) "Recomendaciones e insumos para la definición de una estrategia nacional de Big Data". Data-Pop Alliance. 
Araujo, G., Bravo, M. A., Casasbuenas, V., Letouzé, E., Pentland, A., Loaiza, I., and Wladawsky-Berger, I. (2019) "Propuesta de plan de implementación de la estrategia de Big Data para el Estado". Data-Pop Alliance.
Bravo, M. A., Casasbuenas, V., Letouzé, E. Lozano, A., Pentland, A., and Wladawsky-Berger, I. (2019). "Impacto económico y social de la implementación de la estrategia". Data-Pop Alliance.
Letouzé, E., Pestre, G. and Zagheni, E. (2019). "The ABCDE of big data: assessing biases in call-detail records for development estimates." The World Bank Economic Review.
Letouzé, E., and Oliver, N. (2019). "Sharing is Caring Four Key Requirements for Sustainable Private Data Sharing and Use for Public Good". Data-Pop Alliance and Vodafone Institute for Society and Communications, London.
Hunt, A., et al.  (2019). "Women in the gig economy: paid work, care and flexibility in Kenya and South Africa". ODI.
Chiara, F. D., Letouzé, E., Lizzi, A., Mazariegos, C., and Stock, M. (2019). "Harnessing Innovative Data and Technology to Measure Development Effectiveness". Southern Voice.
 Letouzé, E., and Tandefelt, N., (2019) "Evaluación de nuevas herramientas y técnicas del big data para proyectos del Banco Interamericano de Desarrollo". Data-Pop Alliance.
 De Nadai, M., Gonzales, M., Lepri, B., and Letouzé, E. (2018). "Characterizing and analyzing urban dynamics in Bogotá. Big Data to address global development changes". AFD Research Paper Series. No. 2018-70. pp. 5–21. 
 Letouzé, E., and Pentland, A. (2018). "Towards a human artificial intelligence for human development". ITU Journal: ICT Discoveries, Special Issue, (2).
 Letouzé, E. (2018). "Panorama setorial da internet: Big Data e desenvolvimento: Uma visão geral". Panorama Setorial Da Internet, 10(1), 1–11.
 Montjoye,Y.A., Gambs,S. Letouzé,E. et al."On the privacy-conscientious use of mobile phone data". Scientific Data.  Article number: 180286.
 Letouzé, E. and Sankoya, D. (2017). "How to use Big Data? Leading experts' roadmap to data-driven innovation projects". Vodafone Institute.
 Letouzé, E., Pestre, G., and Zaghnei, E. (2016). "The ABCDE of Big Data: Assessing Biases in Call-detail records for Development Estimates". Annual World Bank Conference on Development Economics.
 Letouzé, E., Areias, A., and Jackson, S. (2016). "Chapter 12: The Evaluation of Complex Development Interventions in the Age of Big Data". Dealing With Complexity in Development Evaluation: A Practical Approach. Thousand Oaks: Sage Publishing.
 Letouzé, E. (2016). "Applications and Implications of Big Data for Demo-Economic Analysis: The Case of Call-Detail Records". Doctoral dissertation, UC Berkeley. 
 Letouzé, E., and Sangokoya, D. (2015) "Big Data and Privacy: Understanding the Possibilities and Pitfalls of the Data Revolution in Germany". Vodafone Institute.
 Kammourieh, L., et al. (2017). "Group privacy in the age of big data". in: Group Privacy (pp. 37–66). Springer, Cham.
 Letouzé, E. (2015). "Big data and development: General overview primer". Data-Pop Alliance White Paper Series.
 Bhargava,R., Deahl,E., Letouzé,E., Noonan,A., Sangokoya,D., and Shoup,N. (2015)"Beyond data literacy: Reinventing community engagement and empowerment in the age of data"
 Letouzé, E. (2015). "Big Data & SDGs note for Global Sustainable Development Report". Data-Pop Alliance.
 Letouzé, E., Vinck, P, and Kammourieh, L. (2015) "The law, politics and ethics of cell phone data analytics". Data-Pop Alliance.
 Romana, S. and Letouzé, E. (2015)"Crossfire: 'The potential of data for development is overstated. The negative impacts on vulnerable populations outweigh the benefits at this point'" Enterprise development & microfinance.
 Kammourieh, L., Letouzé, E. and Vinck, P. (2014) "The Law, Politics and Ethics of Cell Phone Data Analytics" Data-Pop Alliance
 Kroll, G., Carpena, F., Ghosh, I., Letouzé, E., Rosa,J. and Trivedi.P (2014)"Revealing Demand for Pro-Poor Innovations" USAID Learning Lab.
 Letouzé, E. (2013)"Fragile States: Resource Flows and Trends". OECD.
Pritchett, L. Klasen, S., Alkire, S., Lenhardt, A. and Emmanuel Letouzé (2013)"Eradicating global poverty: a noble goal, but how do we measure it?"

On fiscal policy and fiscal space:

 Roy, R., Heuty, A., and Letouzé, E. (2012)."Fiscal space for public investment: Towards a human development approach". Taylor & Francis Group. Routledge 1st edition.
 Roy,R., Heuty, A., and Letouzé, E. (2012). "Fiscal Space for What? Analytical Issues from a Human Development Perspective". Taylor & Francis Group. Routledge 1st edition.

On migration:

 Fiorio, L., Zagheni, E., Abel, G., Hill, J., Pestre, G., Letouzé, E., and Cai, J. (2021). [https://datapopalliance.org/wp-content/uploads/2021/01/8917630.pdf Analyzing the Effect of Time in Migration Measurement Using Georeferenced Digital Trace Data"]. Demography. Duke Press. 
 Lepri, B., Letouzé, E., Pentland, A., and Salah, A. (2019). Guide to Mobile Data Analytics in Refugee Scenarios. Springer, Berlin.
 Salah, A., Pentland, A., Lepri, B., Letouzé, E. et al. (2019). "Introduction to the data for refugees challenge on mobility of Syrian refugees in Turkey". Guide to Mobile Data Analytics in Refugee Scenarios. Springer
 Letouzé, E. (2019) "Leveraging Open Algorithms (OPAL) for the Safe, Ethical, and Scalable Use of Private Sector Data in Crisis Contexts". Guide to Mobile Data Analytics in Refugee Scenarios. Springer. 
 Salah, A. et al. (2018). "Data for refugees: the D4R challenge on mobility of Syrian refugees in Turkey". arXiv preprint arXiv:1807.00523. 
 Fiorio, L., Zagheni, E., Abel, G., Hill, J., Pestre, G., Letouzé, E,. and Cai, J. (2017). "Understanding patterns of human mobility at different time scales". PAA 2018 Annual Meeting. April (pp. 26–28). 
 Letouzé, E., Purser,M., Rodríguez, F., and Cummins,M. (2009). "Revisiting the Migration-Development Nexus: A Gravity Model Approach"

On crime, conflict and violence

 Letouzé, E., Lepri, B., De Nadai, M., González, M. C., Letouzé, E., and Xu, Y. (2020). "Socio-economic, built environment, and mobility conditions associated with crime: a study of multiple cities". Scientific Reports.
 Bogomolov, A., Lepri, B., Letouzé, E.,  Oliver, N., Pianesi, F., and Pentland, A.  (2015). "Moves on the street: Classifying crime hotspots using aggregated anonymized data on people dynamics". Big data, 3(3), 148–158. 
 Letouzé, E., Meier,P,. and Vinck,P. (2013)"Big data for conflict prevention: New oil and old fires". International Peace Institute.
 Mancini, F.,Letouzé, E. et al. (2013)"New technology and the prevention of violence and conflict".  Stability: International Journal of Security and Development, 2(3), p.Art. 55.

On official statistics and human artificial intelligence:

 Oliver, N, et al. (2020). "Mobile phone data for informing public health actions across the COVID-19 pandemic life cycle". Sciences Advances.
 Letouzé, E. (2018). "Retrouver le sens de la mesure pour de meilleures décisions collectives: vers une intelligence artificielle humaine à l'ère des données". Regards croises sur l'economie, (2), 47–55. 
 Letouzé, E. (2018) Mobiliser et humaniser la Révolution des Données pour la statistique publique, le développement et la démocratie". PNUD Togo.
Letouzé, E., Pestre, G., Manske, J., and Sangokoya, D. (2016). "Oportunidades y requerimientos para aprovechar el uso de Big Data para las estadísticas oficiales y los Objetivos de Desarrollo Sostenible en América Latina". Data-Pop Alliance. 
 Roca, T. and Letouzé, E. (2016)"La révolution des données est-elle en marche?". Afrique contemporaine.
 Jütting, J. and Letouzé, E. (2015). "Official statistics, big data and human development". Data-Pop Alliance White Paper Series.

On data and algorithmic governance:

 Lepri, B., Letouzé, E., Oliver, N., Pentland, A., and Vinck, P. (2018). "Fair, transparent, and accountable algorithmic decision-making processes". Philosophy & Technology'', 31(4), 611–627. 
Lepri, B., Letouzé, E., Oliver, N. Sangokoya, D., and Staiano, J. (2017). "The tyranny of data? The bright and dark sides of data-driven decision-making for social good". Springer.
 Letouzé, E., and Sangokoya, D. (2015). "Leveraging Algorithms for Positive Disruption: On data, democracy, society and statistics". Data-Pop Alliance.

References

Living people
1975 births